Sonoraville High School is a high school located outside of Calhoun, Georgia, United States, in the unincorporated community of Sonoraville. It serves grades 9-12 and is part of the Gordon County School District. Sonoraville High School has 971 students. The school opened in 2005; it originally only served grade 9, but expanded to include all four grades over the next two years.

Athletics
Sonoraville High School participates in athletics as a member of Georgia High School Association Class AAAA Region 7. Its mascot is the Phoenix.

References

External links
Sonoraville High School

Public high schools in Georgia (U.S. state)
Schools in Gordon County, Georgia
2005 establishments in Georgia (U.S. state)
Educational institutions established in 2005